Robert MacKinnon (December 5, 1927 – July 7, 2015) was an American college and professional basketball coach.  He coached three different professional teams in his career; the American Basketball Association's Spirits of St. Louis, and the NBA's Buffalo Braves and New Jersey Nets.  MacKinnon also served as the Nets' general manager.

Biography
MacKinnon was a three-sport athlete at McKinley Vocational High School in Buffalo, New York. He was an All-High choice in basketball in 1944, 1945, and 1946, and established a Yale Cup scoring record while pacing the Macks to the City Championship as a junior and senior. Bob excelled in football as well, as an All-High halfback and member of three City Championship teams. He won All-High honors in baseball while leading the Macks to the 1946 City Championship.
 
Although MacKinnon played baseball at Canisius College and captained the 1950 squad, his greatest success as a college athlete came in basketball. His honors included selection to the All-Western New York team in 1948–1950, to the All-Auditorium team in 1949–1950, and as a Sporting News Second-Team All American in 1950. In perhaps his greatest moment of individual distinction, MacKinnon edged out College of the Holy Cross's Bob Cousy as MVP of the Jesuit Game in 1949. MacKinnon is considered one of the most superb defenders and playmakers in Golden Griffin history. Following graduation, baseball beckoned, and MacKinnon signed with the Brooklyn Dodgers organization.  However, a steady diet of cheap motels and long bus trips as a minor-leaguer led him back to his first passion, basketball.

Following a season as a player for the Syracuse Nationals of the National Basketball Association, MacKinnon returned to Buffalo to coach basketball at Canisius High School. He compiled a record of 36–2 over two seasons and was appointed coach of the Canisius College freshman squad.  In 1959, MacKinnon was named head basketball coach and athletic director at Canisius College.  At the time, he was the youngest coach in the NCAA.  The program reached its peak a mere four years later, as the Golden Griffins posted a 19–7 record and made an appearance in the NIT Finals that earned MacKinnon Eastern Coach of the Year honors.  He coached the Griffs for 13 seasons; during his tenure, his capabilities were recognized by his fellow coaches as they selected him to the National Invitation Tournament Selection Committee, the NCAA All-American Selection Committee, and the NCAA Rules Committee.

MacKinnon left Canisius in 1972, signing on with the Buffalo Braves as assistant coach and scout.  Within three seasons, the Braves were a National Basketball Association power. He also coached during 1974–75 in the American Basketball Association, leading the Spirits of St. Louis to a stunning upset of the defending champion New York Nets in the semifinals of the 1975 ABA Playoffs. His achievements in professional basketball were a fitting culmination to a career spent in service to the sport. He was recognized for his prowess as an athlete and coach by his induction into the Greater Buffalo Sports Hall of Fame in 1995.

MacKinnon has been married since 1955 to the former Norma Marie Fell.  They have four daughters and one son. His son, Bob MacKinnon Jr., has coached in the NBA Development League with the Colorado 14ers, Idaho Stampede, and Los Angeles D-Fenders.

MacKinnon died in Williamsville, New York on July 7, 2015, at the age of 87.

Head coaching record

NBA

|-
| style="text-align:left;"|Buffalo
| style="text-align:left;"|
|7||3||4|||| style="text-align:center;"|4th in Atlantic|||—||—||—||—
| style="text-align:center;"|Missed Playoffs
|-
| style="text-align:left;"|New Jersey
| style="text-align:left;"|
|47||12||35|||| style="text-align:center;"|5th in Atlantic|||—||—||—||—
| style="text-align:center;"|Missed Playoffs
|-
| style="text-align:left;"|New Jersey
| style="text-align:left;"|
|39||10||29|||| style="text-align:center;"|5th in Atlantic|||—||—||—||—
| style="text-align:center;"|Missed Playoffs
|-class="sortbottom"
| align="left" |Career
| ||93||25||68||.269|| ||—||—||—||—

ABA

|-
| style="text-align:left;"|St. Louis
| style="text-align:left;"|1974–75
|84||32||52|||| style="text-align:center;"|3rd in Eastern|||10||5||5||.500
| style="text-align:center;"|Lost in Division Finals
|-class="sortbottom"
| align="left" |Career
| ||84||32||52||.381|| ||10||5||5||.500

References

External links
 BasketballReference.com: Bob MacKinnon

1927 births
2015 deaths
American men's basketball coaches
American men's basketball players
Baseball players from New York (state)
Basketball coaches from New York (state)
Basketball players from New York (state)
Boston Celtics assistant coaches
Buffalo Braves assistant coaches
Buffalo Braves head coaches
Canisius Golden Griffins athletic directors
Canisius Golden Griffins baseball coaches
Canisius Golden Griffins baseball players
Canisius Golden Griffins men's basketball coaches
Canisius Golden Griffins men's basketball players
College men's basketball head coaches in the United States
National Basketball Association executives
New Jersey Nets assistant coaches
New Jersey Nets head coaches
People from Chautauqua County, New York
Players of American football from New York (state)
Point guards
Spirits of St. Louis coaches
Utica Pros players